This was the twelfth season of the League Cup, which was known as the John Player Trophy for sponsorship purposes.

Wigan claimed the trophy by beating Leeds by the score of 22-11 in the final played at Elland Road, Leeds, West Yorkshire. The attendance was 19,553 and receipts were £49027.

Background 
This season saw no changes in the  entrants, no new members and no withdrawals, the number remaining at thirty-three.
The  preliminary round of one match remained

Competition and results

Preliminary round 
Involved  1 matches and 2 Clubs

Round 1 - First  Round 

Involved  16 matches and 32 Clubs

Round 2 - Second  Round 

Involved  8 matches and 16 Clubs

Round 2 - Second  Round Replays 
Involved  1 match and 2 Clubs

Round 3 -Quarter Finals 

Involved 4 matches with 8 clubs

Round 4 – Semi-Finals 

Involved 2 matches and 4 Clubs

Final

Teams and scorers 

Scoring - Try = three points - Goal = two points - Drop goal = one point

Timeline in the  final

Prize money 
As part of the sponsorship deal and funds, the  prize money awarded to the competing teams for this season is as follows :-

Note - the  author is unable to trace the award amounts for this season. Can anyone help ?

The road to success 
This tree excludes any preliminary round fixtures

Notes and comments 
1 * Wigan official archives erroneously describe the  match as being one of the first round matches
2 * Wigan official archives give the score as 36-5 but RUGBYLEAGUEproject and Warrington Wolves official archives give it as 36-17
3  * Elland Road,  Leeds,  is the home ground of Leeds United A.F.C. with a capacity of 37,914 (The record attendance was 57,892 set on 15 March 1967 for a cup match Leeds v Sunderland). The ground was originally established in 1897 by Holbeck RLFC who played there until their demise after the conclusion of the 1903-04 season

General information for those unfamiliar 
The council of the Rugby Football League voted to introduce a new competition, to be similar to The Football Association and Scottish Football Association's "League Cup". It was to be a similar knock-out structure to, and to be secondary to, the Challenge Cup. As this was being formulated, sports sponsorship was becoming more prevalent and as a result John Player and Sons, a division of Imperial Tobacco Company, became sponsors, and the competition never became widely known as the "League Cup" 
The competition ran from 1971-72 until 1995-96 and was initially intended for the professional clubs plus the two amateur BARLA National Cup finalists. In later seasons the entries were expanded to take in other amateur and French teams. The competition was dropped due to "fixture congestion" when Rugby League became a summer sport
The Rugby League season always (until the onset of "Summer Rugby" in 1996) ran from around August-time through to around May-time and this competition always took place early in the season, in the Autumn, with the final usually taking place in late January 
The competition was variably known, by its sponsorship name, as the Player's No.6 Trophy (1971–1977), the John Player Trophy (1977–1983), the John Player Special Trophy (1983–1989), and the Regal Trophy in 1989.

See also 
1982–83 Rugby Football League season
1982 Lancashire Cup
1982 Yorkshire Cup
Player's No.6 Trophy
Rugby league county cups

References

External links
Saints Heritage Society
1896–97 Northern Rugby Football Union season at wigan.rlfans.com 
Hull&Proud Fixtures & Results 1896/1897
Widnes Vikings - One team, one passion Season In Review - 1896-97
The Northern Union at warringtonwolves.org
Huddersfield R L Heritage
Wakefield until I die

1982 in English rugby league
1983 in English rugby league
League Cup (rugby league)